XTE J1650-500 is a binary system containing a stellar-mass black hole candidate and 2000–2001 transient binary X-ray source located in the constellation Ara.  
In 2008, it was claimed that this black hole had a mass of 3.8±0.5 solar masses, which would have been the smallest found for any black hole; smaller than GRO 1655-40, the then known smallest of 6.3 . However, this claim was subsequently retracted; the more likely mass is 5–10 solar masses.

The binary period of the black hole and its companion is 0.32 days.

See also
 Stellar black hole

References

Stellar black holes
Ara (constellation)
Binary stars
K-type main-sequence stars